Southern State Correctional Facility (SSCF) was a prison for men located in Delmont, Maurice River Township, New Jersey, United States. It was a part of the New Jersey Department of Corrections. It was adjacent to Bayside State Prison.

Its operations began in 1983. Its buildings consisted of prefabricated units. Prisoners lived in dormitory housing as opposed to individual cells.  It closed in 2022.

References

External links

 Contact Us, New Jersey Department of Corrections

Prisons in New Jersey
Buildings and structures in Cumberland County, New Jersey
1983 establishments in New Jersey
Maurice River Township, New Jersey